Polyommatus amor is a butterfly in the family Lycaenidae. It was described by Lang in 1884. It is found in Ghissar, Darvaz and the western Pamir Mountains.

The larvae feed on Astragalus species.

References

Butterflies described in 1884
Polyommatus
Butterflies of Asia